Growth differentiation factor 11 (GDF11) also known as bone morphogenetic protein 11 (BMP-11) is a protein that in humans is encoded by the growth differentiation factor 11 gene. GDF11 is a member of the Transforming growth factor beta family.

GDF11 acts as a cytokine and its molecular structure is identical in humans, mice and rats. The bone morphogenetic protein group is characterized by a polybasic proteolytic processing site, which is cleaved to produce a protein containing seven conserved cysteine residues.

Tissue distribution 

GDF11 is expressed in many tissues, including skeletal muscle, pancreas, kidney, nervous system, and retina.

Function 

Gene deletion and over-expression studies indicate that GDF11 primarily regulates the embryological development of the skeletal system. It may also help regulate development of the central nervous system, blood vessels, the kidney and other tissues.

GDF11 improves neurodegenerative and neurovascular disease outcomes, increases skeletal muscle volume, and enhances muscle strength. Its wide-ranging biological effects may include the reversal of senescence in clinical applications, as well as the ability to reverse age-related pathological changes and regulate organ regeneration after injury.

Effects on cell growth and differentiation 

GDF11 belongs to the transforming growth factor beta superfamily that controls anterior-posterior patterning by regulating the expression of Hox genes. It determines Hox gene expression domains and rostrocaudal identity in the caudal spinal cord.

During mouse development, GDF11 expression begins in the tail bud and caudal neural plate region. GDF knock-out mice display skeletal defects as a result of patterning problems with anterior-posterior positioning. This cytokine also inhibits the proliferation of olfactory receptor neural progenitors to regulate the number of neurons in the olfactory epithelium, and controls the competence of progenitor cells to regulate numbers of retinal ganglionic cells developing in the retina. Other studies in mice suggest that GDF11 is involved in mesodermal formation and neurogenesis during embryonic development.

GDF11 can bind type I TGF-beta superfamily receptors ACVR1B (ALK4), TGFBR1 (ALK5) and ACVR1C (ALK7), but predominantly uses ALK4 and ALK5 for signal transduction. It is also closely related to myostatin, a negative regulator of muscle growth, both structurally and phylogenetically.

Though GDF11 is 90% structurally similar to myostatin, GDF11's mechanism of action is opposite that of myostatin since it declines with age and exerts anti-aging regenerative effects in skeletal muscle in mice

Human studies 

GDF11 levels fall to zero in humans at a mean age of 73.71. No endogenous GDF11 production results in the cessation of stem cell DNA repair which causes stem cells to die off and their populations fall to zero at an even faster rate. Since one cannot survive without hematopoietic, mesenchymal, etc. stems cells, this suggests that GDF11 may play a key role in maximum lifespan determination.

Elevian, whose founders include Harvard Stem Cell Institute researchers Dr. Amy Wagers, Dr. Lee Rubin and Dr. Rich Lee, has raised $58 million in two rounds of funding to study GDF11.  On June 19, 2022, the New York Times published an article about GDF11 and Elevian titled "Can a 'Magic' Protein Slow the Aging Process?". The article stated that Elevian will conduct clinical trials using GDF11 to repair stroke damage in humans starting in Q1 of 2023.

GDF11 levels in individuals with major depressive disorder are significantly lower compared to healthy controls. Administration of GDF11 in aged mice stimulates neuronal autophagy which improves memory and alleviates senescence and depression-like symptoms in a neurogenesis-independent manner.

It has been reported that GDF11 is down-regulated in pancreatic cancer tissue, compared with surrounding tissue, and pancreatic cell lines exhibit a low expression of the growth factor (65). This group also reported that, in a cohort of 63 PC patients, those with high GDF11 expression had significantly better survival rates in comparison with those with low GDF11 expression. These effects were related to decreased proliferation, migration and invasion, and these observations are in agreement with those reported in HCC and TNBC. GDF11 is also capable of inducing apoptosis in pancreatic cancer cell lines.

However, In 130 patients with colorectal cancer (CRC), the expression of GDF11 was significantly higher compared with normal tissue (56). The classification of the patient cohort in low and high GDF11 expression revealed that those patients with high levels of GDF11 showed a higher frequency of lymph node metastasis, more deaths and lower survival. The study suggests that GDF11 could be a prognostic biomarker in patients with this disease

Animal studies 

In 2014, GDF11 was described as a life extension factor in two publications based on the results of parabiosis experiments in mice  that were chosen as Science's scientific breakthrough of the year. Later studies questioned these findings.  Researchers disagree on the selectivity of the tests used to measure GDF11 and on the activity of GDF11 from various commercially available sources.  The full relationship of GDF11 to aging—and any possible differences in the action of GDF11 in mice, rats, and humans—is unclear and continues to be researched.

GDF11 is a powerful senolytic and antioxidant. GDF11 fed mice saw 45.7% reduction in senescent liver cells and a 21.7% reduction in senescent kidney cells. GDF11 induces generation of antioxidant enzymes (CAT, SOD and GPX), which directly results in reduction of ROS levels, which then decelerates protein oxidation, lipid peroxidation and possibly LF and SA-β-Gal development, which in turn extends lifespan of aged mice.

GDF11 attenuates the senescence of ovarian and testicular cells, and contributes to the recovery of ovarian and testicular endocrine functions. Moreover, GDF11 could rescue the diminished ovarian reserve in female mice and enhance the activities of marker enzymes of testicular function (SDH and G6PD) in male mice, suggesting a potential improvement of fertility.

Systematic replenishment of GDF11 improved the survival and morphology of β-cells and improved glucose metabolism in both non genetic and genetic mouse models of type 2 diabetes.

GDF11 triggers a calorie restriction‐like phenotype without affecting appetite or GDF15 levels in the blood, restores the insulin/IGF‐1 signaling pathway, and stimulates adiponectin secretion from white adipose tissue by direct action on adipocytes, while repairing neurogenesis in the aged brain.

GDF11 gene transfer alleviates HFD-induced obesity, hyperglycemia, insulin resistance, and fatty liver development. In obese and STZ-induced diabetic mice, GDF11 gene transfer restores glucose metabolism and improves insulin resistance.

GDF11 contributes to limiting functional damage of mitochondria in cardiomyocytes (heart cells) following ischemic (lack of blood flow) injury or anoxia (oxygen deprivation) insult, and repressing apoptosis in mitochondria-dependent and mitochondria-independent manners by increasing telomerase activities. This suggests that GDF11 may be an effective treatment for post heart attack patients.

GDF11 enhances therapeutic efficacy of mesenchymal stem cells for myocardial Infarction. This novel role of GDF11 may be used for a new approach of stem cell therapy for myocardial infarction.

GDF11 improves endothelial dysfunction, decreases endothelial apoptosis, and reduces inflammation, consequently decreases atherosclerotic plaques area in apolipoprotein E−/− mice.

GDF11 attenuates liver fibrosis via expansion of liver progenitor cells. The protective role of GDF11 during liver fibrosis and suggest a potential application of GDF11 for the treatment of chronic liver disease.

GDF11 improves tubular regeneration after acute kidney injury in elderly mice. Supplementing GDF11 increased tubular cell dedifferentiation and proliferation as well as improved the prognosis of old mice that underwent ischemia–reperfusion injury by upregulating the ERK1/2 signaling pathway.

GDF11 is a regulator of skin biology and has significant effects on the production of procollagen I and hyaluronic acid. GDF11 also activates the Smad2/3 phosphorylation pathway in skin endothelial cells and improves skin vasculature.

GDF11 exerts considerable anti-aging effects on skin. As the key member of the TGF-Beta superfamily, GDF11 represents a promising therapeutic agent for the treatment of a number of inflammatory skin diseases, including psoriasis.

This GDF11 paper summarizes GDF11 expression in various organs as well as a table showing effects of GDF11 in cardiac, muscle skeletal and nervous system disease.

Supplementation of systemic GDF11 levels, which normally decline with age, by heterochronic parabiosis or systemic delivery of recombinant protein, reversed functional impairments and restored genomic integrity in aged muscle stem cells (satellite cells). Increased GDF11 levels in aged mice also improved muscle structural and functional features and increased strength and endurance exercise capacity.

Treatment of old mice to restore GDF11 to youthful levels recapitulated the effects of parabiosis and reversed age-related hypertrophy, revealing a therapeutic opportunity for cardiac aging.

GDF11 has been found to reduce oxidative stress and was able to reduce the levels of AGEs, protein oxidation and lipid peroxidation, and to slow down the accumulation of age-related histological markers. GDF11 significantly prevented the decrease in CAT, GPX and SOD activities,

Enhanced GDF11 expression promoted apoptosis and down-regulated GDF11 expression inhibited apoptosis in pancreatic cancer cell lines. These findings suggested that GDF11 acted as a tumor suppressor for pancreatic cancer.

GDF11 induces tumor suppressive properties in human hepatocellular carcinoma-derived cells, Huh7 and Hep3B cell lines, restricting spheroid formation and clonogenic capacity, an effect that is also observed in other liver cancer cell lines (SNU-182, Hepa1-6, and HepG2), decreasing proliferation, motogenesis, and invasion. Similarly, Bajikar et al. (23) identified a tumor-suppressive role of GDF11 in a triple-negative breast cancer (TNBC).

References

Further reading

External links 
 
 
 

Developmental genes and proteins
TGFβ domain
Aging-related proteins